Coyllococha (possibly from Quechua quyllu impeccable white; generic name for a kind of potatoes, qucha lake,) is a lake in Peru located in the Junín Region, Huancayo Province, Chongos Alto District. Coyllococha lies southwest of  Yurajcocha and Huichicocha. It belongs to the watershed of the Mantaro River.

The lake is sometimes also named Coyllorcocha (possibly from Quechua quyllur star, "star lake"). This name correlates with the name of mountain at the western end of the lake whose name is Coyllor (Quyllur).

It is operated by Electroperu.

References 

Lakes of Peru
Lakes of Junín Region
Dams in Peru
Buildings and structures in Junín Region